Shake Your Money Maker (also stylized as The Black Crowes Present: $hake Your Money Maker) is the debut studio album by American rock band the Black Crowes, released on February 13, 1990 on Def American Recordings. It is the only album by the band to feature guitarist Jeff Cease. The album is named after a classic blues song written by Elmore James. The Black Crowes have played the song live many times over the years, but it is not included on this album.

Shake Your Money Maker peaked at No. 4 on the Billboard 200, and two of its singles, "Hard to Handle" and "She Talks to Angels", reached No. 1 on the Mainstream Rock Tracks chart. "Jealous Again", "Twice As Hard" and "Seeing Things" were also charting singles in the United States. Shake Your Money Maker is the Black Crowes' best selling album, having sold more than 5 million copies.

On January 8, 2021, the Black Crowes announced that a 30th anniversary edition of the album would be released on February 26, 2021. The new version contains the original tracks remastered in addition to three previously unreleased songs, outtakes, two demos from the Mr. Crowe's Garden era, and a live performance set recorded in 1990 at Center Stage in Atlanta. Previously unreleased track "Charming Mess" was released on the same day as the announcement.

Background and production
Brothers Chris and Rich Robinson had formed Mr. Crowe's Garden in 1984. In 1988 George Drakoulias saw the band at a show they did in New York City and had them signed to Def American the same year; they changed their name to the Black Crowes shortly after.

The recording sessions began in the summer of 1989 in Atlanta and Los Angeles, with Drakoulias producing the album. Some tracks include retained songs from the Mr. Crowe's Garden era such as "Could I've Been So Blind" and "She Talks to Angels", whose riff had been written years ago by then-17 year old Rich Robinson with lyrics written by Chris, which were inspired by a heroin-addicted girl he "kinda knew" in Atlanta. The band also chose to record a cover version of Otis Redding's "Hard to Handle", which would prove to be their breakthrough single.

Four music videos for "Twice As Hard", "Jealous Again", "Hard to Handle" and "She Talks to Angels" were filmed to promote the band and the album, and subsequently aired on MTV.

Release and reception

When the album came out in February 1990, critical reception was mostly favorable. Rolling Stone gave the album three out of five stars, and its readers and critics voted the Black Crowes "Best New American Band" in 1990; the band appeared on the cover of the magazine's 605th issue (May 1991) following their firing from the ZZ Top tour in March that year. The issue's interview of Chris and Rich Robinson compared the band to 1970s acts, with journalist David Fricke explicitly citing Faces and The Rolling Stones and Rich Robinson mentioning Aerosmith. AllMusic gave the album four out of five stars, praising Rich Robinson's guitar playing and Chris Robinson's "appropriate vocal swagger". Entertainment Weekly gave it a B+ and stated, "The Black Crowes are to the early Rolling Stones what Christian Slater is to the young Jack Nicholson: a self-conscious imitation, but fine enough in its own right. Authentic bluesmen these Crowes will never be, but their sheer energy earns 'em the right to trash it up."

"Hard to Handle", "Jealous Again" and "Twice As Hard" broke into the Mainstream Rock Tracks charts, respectively reaching the first, fifth and eleventh position. By the end of the year, Shake Your Money Maker had sold one million copies and eventually sold two million more, thus receiving triple platinum certification. In 1991, "She Talks to Angels" and "Seeing Things" respectively reached the first and second position of the Mainstream Rock Tracks charts.

Track listing

30th Anniversary Edition

Notes
 "Live Too Fast Blues/Mercy, Sweet Moan" follows the bonus tracks on the 1998 reissue of the album.
 "Live Too Fast Blues/Mercy, Sweet Moan" does not appear on digital or streaming versions of the original album, thus cutting the track listing down to 10 songs.
 The bonus tracks were originally part of the recording sessions at Soundscape Studios in Atlanta.

Personnel
The Black Crowes
Chris Robinson – vocals
Rich Robinson – guitar
Jeff Cease – guitar
Johnny Colt – bass guitar
Steve Gorman – drums

Additional personnel
Laura Creamer – background vocals
Chuck Leavell – piano, organ
Brendan O'Brien – "a potpourri of instruments"

Production
George Drakoulias – producer
Rick Rubin – executive producer (credited on the sleeve only after the album became successful)
Pete Angelus – personal manager
Dave Bianco – remixing on "Twice As Hard"
Alan Forbes – artwork, art direction, design
Greg Fulginiti – mastering
Tag George – assistant engineer
Michael Lavine – photography
Ruth Leitman – photography, cover photo
Lee Manning – assistant engineer, mixing, mixing engineer
Brendan O'Brien – engineer, mixing
Leon Zervos – mastering

Charts

Weekly charts

Year-end charts

Certifications

References

The Black Crowes albums
American Recordings (record label) albums
1990 debut albums
Albums produced by George Drakoulias
Albums produced by Rick Rubin